Happy Jack may refer to:

 "Happy Jack" (song), a song by English rock band The Who; released as a single in 1966
 Happy Jack (album), 1967 US release of A Quick One, the 1966 studio album by The Who
 "Happy Jack" Angokwazhuk (c. 1870 - 1918), an Eskimo carver
 Jack M. "Happy Jack" Ilfrey, United States Army Air Forces pilot during World War II
 John "Happy Jack" Scaddan (1876–1934), former premier of Western Australia
 John "Happy Jack" Wilton (1910–1981), Australian general
 Happy Jack, 1918 children's novel by Thornton Burgess
 Happy Jack, a play by John Godber, published in 1989, about a couple who live in a mining village in West Yorkshire

Places
 Happy Jack, Arizona, an unincorporated town in Southwestern United States
 Happy Jack Chalk Mine (Greeley County, Nebraska), an underground limestone quarry Central United States, south of Scotia, Nebraska
 Happy Jack Peak, a hill in Greeley County, Nebraska, United States
 Happy Jack, Louisiana, an unincorporated community in Southern United States
 Happy Jack Mine, a uranium mine near Monticello, Utah, United States
 Happy Jack Road, Wyoming Highway 210 in Western United States
 Happy Jack Summit, a mountain pass in the Southern Rocky Mountains, in Wyoming, United States.

See also
 Smilin' Jack (disambiguation)